Brown General Hospital was a military medical facility erected by the Union Army in Louisville, Kentucky, during the American Civil War. It was the largest of six general military hospitals scattered throughout the city. Army surgeons administered the hospital, aided by civilian agencies such as the United States Sanitary Commission and the U.S. Christian Commission.

The sprawling hospital was located near the Belknap campus of the University of Louisville, not far away from Fort McPherson. At times, especially in late 1864 through the end of the war, it housed more than a thousand patients. Conditions were often crowded, with insufficient medical staff (particularly surgeons and nurses) to fully treat the sick and wounded.

A large number of ill soldiers from the Atlanta Campaign and other operations in the South were transported to Brown General Hospital for treatment; several died and were buried in a small cemetery adjoining the medical complex. Others were interred in Cave Hill Cemetery.

Brown became known as a leading regional center for the treatment of ophthalmic disorders, with Dr. Charles Porter Hart as chief eye surgeon.

English-born Major Blencowe E. Fryer was in charge of the facility from June 1863 until June 1865. Brown remained operational for more than a year after the war, when the army finally closed it and transferred the last remaining patients to other sites.

See also
List of former United States Army medical units

Notes

References
 United States Sanitary Commission Bulletin. Volume III, Numbers 25–40, 1866. New York: United States Sanitary Commission, 1866.
 Powell, William Henry, Powell's Records of Living Officers of the United States Army. Philadelphia: L. R. Hamersly & Company, 1890
 Rutkow, Ira M., The History of Surgery in the United States, 1775-1900. Norman Publishing, 1988. .

Louisville, Kentucky, in the American Civil War
Former buildings and structures in Louisville, Kentucky
Defunct hospitals in Kentucky
American Civil War hospitals
American Civil War sites
Closed medical facilities of the United States Army
Military installations closed in 1866
Kentucky in the American Civil War
1866 disestablishments in Kentucky